Tritonoturris subrissoides is a species of sea snail, a marine gastropod mollusk in the family Raphitomidae.

Description
The length of the shell varies between 7 mm and 15 mm.

Distribution
This marine species occurs off the Philippines, Hawaii, Papua New Guinea and New-Caledonia.

References

 Hervier, J., 1896. Description d'espèces nouvelles de l'Archipel Néo-Calédonien. Journal de Conchyliologie 43("1895"): 141–152

External links
 MNHN, Paris: specimen
  Kay, E. A. (1979). Hawaiian marine shells. Reef and shore fauna of Hawaii. Section 4: Mollusca. Bernice P. Bishop Museum Special Publications. 64xviii + 1–653
 Moretzsohn, Fabio, and E. Alison Kay. "HAWAIIAN MARINE MOLLUSCS." (1995)
 Gastropods.com: Tritonoturris subrissoides
 Alexander Fedosov, Reconstruction of the foregut of Tritonoturris subrissoides

subrissoides
Gastropods described in 1897